Aulacofusus herendeeni is a species of sea snail, a marine gastropod mollusc in the family Buccinidae, the true whelks.

Description
(Original description as Colus (Aulacofusus) nobilis) The large shell has a length of 85 mm. It is regular, acute, whitish, with a warm yellow-brown persistent periostracum. The shell contains eight whorls, exclusive of the very minute (lost) protoconch. They are separated by a very sharply defined suture and are elegantly rounded. The spiral sculpture consists of (on the penultimate whorl about 15) flattened revolving close-set cords either in pairs or medially grooved for the most part, practically uniform over the whole shell. The axial sculpture consists only of fine silky incremental lines. The aperture is rather wide with 43 mm. The thin outer lip is expanded, more or less crenulated internally by the effect of the external sculpture. The body and the columella are covered with a thick, continuous coat of enamel. The short siphonal canal is distinct and slightly recurved. The blackish operculum is solidand has an apical nucleus.

Distribution
Tjhis species occurs in the Bering Sea and off the Aleutian Islands.

References

 Kosyan A.R. & Kantor Yu.I. (2013). Revision of the genus Aulacofusus Dall, 1918 (Gastropoda: Buccinidae). Ruthenica: The Russian Malacological Journal. 23(1): 1-33.

External links
 Dall, W. H. (1902). Illustrations and descriptions of new, unfigured, or imperfectly known shells, chiefly American in the U. S. National Museum. Proceedings of the United States National Museum. 24 (1264): 499-566, pls 27-40

Buccinidae
Gastropods described in 1902